Zlokuće may refer to:

 Zlokuće (Bugojno), village in the municipality of Bugojno, Bosnia and Herzegovina
 Zlokuće (Kakanj), village in the municipality of Kakanj, Bosnia and Herzegovina